HMS Marne was an M-class destroyer of the Royal Navy commissioned on 2 December 1941.  She was built by Vickers-Armstrongs at High Walker Yard, Newcastle-upon-Tyne, England, and saw service in the Atlantic theatre of World War II.

Service history

Royal Navy

On 12 November 1942 the German submarine  torpedoed and sunk Hecla, and minutes later fired two more torpedoes and badly damaged Marne, blowing off her stern. Michael Flanders, who was to become a famous actor and writer, was serving on board as part of the Royal Navy Volunteer Reserve

Turkish Navy
Following the Second World War Marne, along with three other ships of the same class, was transferred to the Turkish Navy as part of an agreement signed at Ankara on 16 August 1957. They underwent a refit which involved the removal of the after set of torpedo tubes and some secondary armament. They received a new deckhouse and Squid anti-submarine weapons system. On 29 June 1959 they were handed over at Portsmouth. Marne was renamed Mareşal Fevzi Çakmak, after Fevzi Çakmak (1876–1950), the Turkish Mareşal (Field Marshal) and Chief of Staff of the Armed Forces.

The ship remained in service with the Turkish Navy until 1970, when she was discarded and scrapped.

Notes

References

External links
Roll of honour

 

L and M-class destroyers of the Royal Navy
Ships built on the River Tyne
1940 ships
World War II destroyers of the United Kingdom
Ships built by Vickers Armstrong